E576 or E-576 may be:
 Sodium gluconate, a sequestrant
 European route E576, a European route class B road connecting the Romanian cities of Dej and Cluj-Napoca